Robert O. Lawton (1924–1980) was a professor at Florida State University (FSU). He was born in Greenwood, South Carolina and attended Wofford College until joining the army during World War II. He became a Sergeant in the Infantry and was injured in combat in Germany. He was awarded the Distinguished Service Cross. At FSU he served in various administrative roles, particularly as the Dean of College of Arts and Sciences from 1966 to 1972.  After his death in an automobile accident in 1980, the school named the award of University Distinguished Professor after him. He received an honorary degree of L.H.D. from Wofford College in 1968–69.

References

External links
Robert O. Lawton award citation for the Distinguished Service Cross, at MilitaryTimes

1924 births
1980 deaths
Florida State University faculty
People from Greenwood, South Carolina
Recipients of the Distinguished Service Cross (United States)
Wofford College alumni